Westfield Plenty Valley is a shopping centre in the suburb of South Morang, Victoria, Australia. Until its expansion in 2008, it was known as Plenty Valley Town Centre and hosted one major store (Coles Supermarket), and approximately 22 specialty stores.

Westfield Plenty Valley has approx 183 stores, and is anchored by five major stores: Coles, Woolworths, Aldi, Target and Kmart. There are also 2,650 car spaces and a 600-seat food court. The centre opened on 22 May 2008.

History

Development
A new Myer department store was proposed but was abandoned by a company restructure.

South Morang Railway Station is adjacent to Westfield Plenty Valley and opened in April 2012.

On February 7, 2017, construction started on a Gold Class V/max Cinema complex and a line-up of new restaurants including Pancake Parlour and Grill'd as part of an $80 million redevelopment. The new complex had opened on March 2018.

Tenants 
Westfield Plenty Valley has 5 major anchor tenants including:

 Coles - supermarket
 Woolworths - supermarket
 Target - discount department store
 Kmart - discount department store
 Aldi - supermarket

Other retailers in the centre include:

 Village Cinemas - movie theatres
 Rebel - sporting equipment and apparel
 JB Hi-Fi - consumer goods
 The Reject Shop - discount variety store
 Best & Less - apparel
 Chemist Warehouse - discount pharmacy
 Priceline Pharmacy - discount pharmacy

Further reading 

 Scentre Group
 Westfield Group
 Pacific Epping
 Greensborough Plaza
 Mill Park

References

External links

Shopping centres in Melbourne
Shopping malls established in 2000
2000 establishments in Australia
Plenty Valley
Buildings and structures in the City of Whittlesea